Tanah Abang Station (THB) is a railway station located in Kampung Bali, Tanah Abang. This station located to the east of West Flood Canal. The station and the canal are only separated by a small, narrow embankment and as such, Tanah Abang station is prone to flooding, especially during the heavy rain season.

Tanah Abang station serves as the terminus for KA Commuter line Tanah Abang–Rangkasbitung. It used to serve some intercity services, but after the opening of Rangkasbitung, all local train services towards Merak use Rangkasbitung station as their terminus, therefore local train services do not stop in Tanah Abang station anymore.

This station, alongside Duri railway station, serves as transfer stations for the only train services towards South Tangerang and Tangerang respectively. As commuters from these two satellite cities need to change train here before going to other places in Jakarta, these two stations tend to be crowded especially in rush hour.

Tanah Abang locomotive depot was located north of the station. It was demolished in 2023 to make way for the station's enlargement project. The demolition work was started on 25 December 2022. After demolition, two derelict locomotives of BB304 class and BB306 class each and two freight cars remains at the site. They were scrapped on 13 March 2023.

History 

The history of Tanah Abang station was date back from 1899 railway line Jakarta–Anyer Kidul. The first segment, Jakarta–Tanah Abang–Rangkasbetung (currently Rangkasbitung) was opened on 1 October 1899 according to State Railway Company of the Dutch East Indies' 1921, 1925 and 1932 Annual Report.

The original station building has been demolished and replaced with the present two-story building, which is equipped with a passenger crossing bridge and escalators. This building was inaugurated on June 3, 1997 by the then Minister of Transportation, Haryanto Dhanutirto. This new building was made to accommodate KRL Commuterline passengers, which at that time were already operating on the Tanah Abang–Serpong route.

Building and layout 
Tanah Abang Station originally had five railway lines. Line 2 is a straight double track track heading to Duri-Kampung Bandan, line 3 is a straight double track track going to Sudirman-Manggarai, and line 5 is a single straight track going to Rangkasbitung-Merak. After the construction of a double track on the Tanah Abang-Serpong segment on July 4 2007, the layout of the station was overhauled so that the number of lines increased to six with line 5 being a double track straight from Rangkasbitung-Merak and line 6 being a straight line in the direction of Rangkasbitung-Merak. This station is also equipped with a locomotive depot which is located to the northeast of the station and is directly connected to line 1.

Over time, this station also continues to grow, with a new entrance and exit building located close to the Tanah Abang Locomotive Depot. The new entrance and exit building is also equipped with various new facilities, such as various shops. The entrance and exit of this station have been integrated with the pedestrian bridge which faces Jalan Jatibaru Bengkel, as well as the skybridge that connects Tanah Abang Station with Tanah Abang Market.

In addition to serving KRL and Locomotive Railroads, Tanah Abang Station is also used as a parking lot for the Jayakarta series, a long series of passenger trains consisting of 15 trains in one series, which previously was a parking lot for the Gumarang series and now this series has been moved to Tanjung Priuk Station.Priuk since the Jayakarta series came to Tanah Abang Station to change the parking space that was previously at Tanjung Priuk Station. Starting in July 2022, the parking lot for the long-distance and long-distance trains (Jayakarta) was at Tanah Abang Station and now the long-distance and long-distance trains have been moved to the Cipinang Train Depot (CPN) to make it easier to send the trains to Pasar Senen Station. Starting December 25, 2022 all locomotives, KRD Helpers, and Inspection Trains (KAIS) at the Tanah Abang Locomotive Depot will be moved to the Cipinang Locomotive Depot, and it is planned that the Tanah Abang Locomotive Depot here will be the New Tanah Abang Station. Indeed, it has been a long time since the Jakarta Provincial Government, the Ministry of Transportation, and PT KAI have planned to build a new Tanah Abang Station building, carrying the concept of Transit Oriented Development (TOD). Apart from the station, apartments will also be built like those at Tanjung Barat Station and Pondok Cina Station.

Services

Passenger services 
 KAI Commuter
  Cikarang Loop Line (Full Racket)
  Cikarang Loop Line (Half Racket), to / (via ) and 

Defunct services 
 Kalimaya intercity (Merak-Tanah Abang) closed 1 April 2017
 Patas Merak intercity (Merak-Angke via Tanah Abang) closed 1 April 2017
 Rangkas Jaya intercity (Tanah Abang-Rangkasbitung) closed 1 April 2017
 Krakatau intercity (Merak-Kediri via Tanah Abang) closed 17 July 2017. The service now only serves Pasar Senen-Blitar route and renamed Singosari

Supporting transportation

Places of interest 
Textile Museum (Jakarta)
Tanah Abang Market

References

External links
 

Central Jakarta
Railway stations in Jakarta
Railway stations opened in 1899
1899 establishments in the Dutch Empire
1899 establishments in Asia